Wim Kelleners (born 9 May 1950) is a Dutch racing cyclist. He rode in the 1973 Tour de France.

References

External links
 

1950 births
Living people
Dutch male cyclists
Place of birth missing (living people)